"In Over My Heart" is a song written by Walt Aldridge, Tom Brasfield and James Rutledge, and recorded by American country music artist T. G. Sheppard.  It was released in December 1985 as the third single from the album Livin' on the Edge.  The song reached #9 on the Billboard Hot Country Singles & Tracks chart.

Chart performance

References

1986 singles
1985 songs
T. G. Sheppard songs
Songs written by Walt Aldridge
Columbia Records singles
Songs written by Tom Brasfield